Paul Clark born 1957 is a Canadian retired Paralympic athlete. He competed at the 1980, 1984 and 1988 Paralympics Clark was injured in a motorcycle accident in Woodstock, Ontario at the age of 15 and at the time of the Paralympics, lived in Terrace, British Columbia.

References

Living people
1950s births
Medalists at the 1984 Summer Paralympics
Medalists at the 1988 Summer Paralympics
Paralympic medalists in athletics (track and field)
Paralympic gold medalists for Canada
Paralympic silver medalists for Canada
Athletes (track and field) at the 1984 Summer Paralympics
Athletes (track and field) at the 1988 Summer Paralympics
Paralympic track and field athletes of Canada
Canadian male wheelchair racers